R v Marshall; R v Bernard 2005 SCC 43 is a leading Aboriginal rights decision of the Supreme Court of Canada where the Court narrowed the test from R. v. Marshall for determining the extent of constitutional protection upon Aboriginal practices. The Court held that there was no right to commercial logging granted in the "Peace and Friendship treaties of 1760", the same set of treaties where the right to commercial fishing was granted in the R. v. Marshall decision. This decision also applied and developed the test for aboriginal title from Delgamuukw v British Columbia.

Background
This decision considers two separate cases. In the first one, Stephen Marshall (no relation to Donald Marshall) and 34 other Mi'kmaq were charged with cutting down timber on Nova Scotia Crown land without a permit. In the second case, Joshua Bernard, a Mi'kmaq man, was charged with possession of logs stolen from a rural New Brunswick saw mill that were cut from Crown lands.

In both cases all of those accused argued that their status as Indian gave them the right to log on Crown land for commercial purposes as granted by the treaties of Peace and Friendship.

At trial, the judges convicted all of those accused. At the provincial courts of appeal, the convictions were overturned.

Opinion of the court
McLachlin, writing for the majority, held that there was no right to commercial logging under the treaties. From the evidence she found that it did not support the conclusion that commercial logging formed the basis of the Mi'kmaq's traditional culture and identity.  The majority restored the convictions at trial.

Regarding the claim of aboriginal title, the majority affirms the test from Delgamuukw: "claimants must prove “exclusive” pre-sovereignty “occupation” of the land by their forebears." Applying this test, the majority did not find that seasonal hunting or fishing in an area was sufficient, on its own, to establish the existence of aboriginal title. They left open the possibility that with enough evidence, nomadic or semi-nomadic people could establish aboriginal title based on their non-permanent use of a piece of land, as long as sufficient exclusivity or control was also demonstrated.

See also
List of Supreme Court of Canada cases (McLachlin Court)
The Canadian Crown and First Nations, Inuit and Métis
 Canadian Aboriginal case law
Numbered Treaties
Indian Act
Section Thirty-five of the Constitution Act, 1982
Indian Health Transfer Policy (Canada)

External links
 

Canadian constitutional case law
Supreme Court of Canada cases
Canadian Aboriginal case law
2005 in Canadian case law